Porgy and Bess is a 1976 album by pianist Oscar Peterson and guitarist Joe Pass featuring music from George Gershwin's opera Porgy and Bess. This is the only album on which Peterson plays the clavichord.

Critical reception

AllMusic critic Scott Yanow wrote in his review: "The results are novel at first but rather limited on the whole, making one wonder whose bright idea this was."

Track listing
All compositions by George Gershwin, with all lyrics by Ira Gershwin and DuBose Heyward, except otherwise noted.
 "Summertime" - 4:27
 "Bess, You Is My Woman Now" - 3:38
 "My Man's Gone Now" - 3:07
 "It Ain't Necessarily So" (George Gershwin, Ira Gershwin) - 3:30
 "I Loves You Porgy" - 6:26
 "I Got Plenty O' Nuttin'" - 3:02
 "Oh Bess, Oh Where's My Bess?" - 5:32
 "They Pass by Singin'" - 2:31
 "There's a Boat Dat's Leavin' Soon for New York" - 3:54
 "Strawberry Woman" - 5:40

Charts

Personnel
 Oscar Peterson - clavichord
 Joe Pass  - acoustic guitar
 Norman Granz - producer

References

1976 albums
Joe Pass albums
Oscar Peterson albums
Albums produced by Norman Granz
Pablo Records albums
Oscar Peterson and Joe Pass album
Collaborative albums